The rapes and murders of Julie and Robin Kerry occurred on April 5, 1991, on the Chain of Rocks Bridge over the Mississippi River in St. Louis, Missouri. The two sisters were raped and then murdered by a group of four males, who also attempted to murder the sisters' cousin.

Marlin A. Gray (September 29, 1967 – October 26, 2005) was convicted of aiding and abetting and was executed by the U.S. state of Missouri by lethal injection. His conviction was for being a part of the group of four men involved in the murders. Gray continued to protest his innocence saying that although he was at the bridge at the time, he was smoking cannabis in a nearby car. On December 9, 1992, Gray was convicted of aiding and abetting and was executed on October 26, 2005. He maintained his innocence to the end. In 2017, DNA evidence proved he was an active participant in the crimes.

The events of April 4–5, 1991 

On the night of April 4/morning of April 5, 20-year-old Julie Kerry, 19-year-old Robin Kerry, and their 19-year-old cousin, Thomas Cummins, were on the Chain of Rocks Bridge over the Mississippi River. Gray, Antonio Richardson, Reginald Clemons, and Daniel Winfrey went to the bridge that night together. The two groups, who did not know each other, had a brief conversation. Gray showed the other group how to climb down a manhole cover on the bridge down to the pier. Then the two groups separated.

The prosecution's version of the events 
According to testimony offered on behalf of the prosecution, several minutes later the group of four men decided to rob the three, with Winfrey testifying that Gray said he "felt like hurting somebody." They returned and Gray told Cummins that "This is a robbery. Get down on the ground." The two girls were grabbed and held on the ground. Richardson held Julie down while Clemons raped her and then the two swapped positions. Gray, Richardson, and Clemons then alternately raped Robin and Julie. Cummins was then robbed of his wallet, wristwatch, cash, and keys, and the three victims were forced down the manhole cover to the concrete pier. The two Kerry sisters then were pushed, and Cummins jumped as instructed. Medical witnesses testified that Cummins and Julie Kerry survived the  fall to the water below. Cummins testified that after surfacing, the current pulled him over to Julie, but then she drifted off after he began to drown. Cummins swam to shore and survived. The body of Julie Kerry was found three weeks later near Caruthersville, Missouri; the body of Robin Kerry was not found.

Gray's version of the events 
Gray's version of the events was very different. In an interview in 2005, he said that after parting from the group of three, Gray went to a car where he smoked marijuana, while Richardson went to retrieve a flashlight (stolen by Richardson from a police officer's residence) he had left on the bridge. Gray returned to the bridge 30 minutes later to find that the girls and their cousin were gone. Richardson said that Cummins had said the girls had slipped off the bridge but thought the authorities would not believe this story. Cummins was then robbed by the men of his belongings. The version given by Gray at his trial was different, and also differs from what police said that he told them in his initial interview. On returning after 30 minutes in the car, Clemons informed him that "Man, I just robbed that guy and threw him and the girls into the river."

Trial and appeals 
Police initially refused to believe Thomas Cummins' version of the events. They theorized that the other men never existed and he had made up the story to cover up his attempted rape of his cousins. They believed Julie had fallen off the bridge while resisting his sexual advances, Robin had jumped in to save her, and both had drowned. Cummins was initially charged with murder but released due to lack of evidence. He later won a settlement from the St. Louis police department for wrongful interrogation techniques.
 
Daniel Winfrey, who was 15 years old at the time, confessed to the murder in the presence of police and his parents. He pleaded guilty to second-degree murder and forcible rape and testified against the other three in their trials. He received a 30-year sentence. He testified that Clemons and Richardson were the ones who had pushed the two girls. Winfrey was the only white member of the convicted group, which has been raised as a criticism since he was the main prosecution witness.

Winfrey was granted parole in the summer of 2007; when released, he had served 15 years.

Clemons was sentenced to death but his conviction was overturned in 2015. On December 18th, 2017, Clemons plead guilty to five counts: two counts of second-degree murder, two counts of rape and one count of first degree robbery. He was sentenced to five consecutive life sentences without the possibility of parole. 

Richardson was also given a death sentence, however, it was commuted to life in prison by the Supreme Court of Missouri on October 28, 2003. The court cited his sentencing by a judge rather than a jury to be in violation of Apprendi v. New Jersey (a case that was decided long after the imposition of sentence). Richardson had been the focus of strenuous efforts by death penalty opponents due to his alleged mental deficiencies and because of his age at the time of the murders, even though his own psychologist and his mother testified that he "know[s] the difference between right and wrong." In 2005, the Supreme Court of the United States ruled that executions of persons who committed their crimes as juveniles were unconstitutional.

Execution 
Gray's execution date was set by the Missouri Supreme Court for September 26, 2005. Governor Matt Blunt denied Gray clemency on October 25 based on a recommendation by the Missouri Board of Probation and Parole. That same day, the Supreme Court of the United States denied his motions to stay his execution.

Gray asked that no member of his family witness the execution, which he described as "murder," although a female cousin and a minister were present. The only witness for the victims present at the execution was Kevin Cummins, the uncle of the two girls. Gray also made no last meal request and gave no instructions for the disposal of his body. His final statement: "I go forward now on wings built by the love and support of my family and friends. I go with a peace of mind that comes from never having taken a human life. I forgive those who have hardened their hearts to the truth and I pray they ask forgiveness, for they know not what they do. This is not a death, it is a lynching."

New evidence 
Reginald Clemons was awarded a new trial in 2015. Prosecutors presented new evidence that proved Gray was on the bridge during the crimes. Clemons' guilty plea states "DNA from Clemons and a co-defendant, Marlin [Gray], indicative of sexual activity was found on pants Gray wore during the crime". For his plea, Clemons was given five consecutive life sentences, without the possibility of parole, instead of the death penalty.

Media 
The murder of Julie and Robin Kerry was the subject of a 2005 episode of American Justice entitled "The Bridge Murders". 

Thomas Cummins' sister Jeanine Cummins wrote a memoir about the murders entitled A Rip in Heaven.

See also 
 Capital punishment in Missouri
 Capital punishment in the United States
 List of people executed in Missouri
 List of people executed in the United States in 2005

References

External links 
 Capital punishment in Missouri
 
 Report from National Coalition to Abolish the Death Penalty.
 Marlin Gray. The Clark County Prosecuting Attorney. Retrieved on 2007-11-17.
 "Reginald Clemons pleads guilty to murder in Old Chain of Rocks Bridge case"|. Retrieved on 2018-8-3.

1990s trials
1991 deaths
1991 in Missouri
1991 murders in the United States
April 1991 crimes
April 1991 events in the United States
Capital murder cases
Crimes in Missouri
Deaths by person in Missouri
Female murder victims
Gang rape in the United States
Incidents of violence against women
Murder trials
People murdered in Missouri
Rape trials in the United States
Rapes in the United States
Sexual assaults in the United States
Sisters
History of women in Missouri